Sandstrand may refer to the following locations:

Sandstrand, Nordland, a village in Sortland municipality, Nordland county, Norway
Sandstrand, Troms, a village in Skånland municipality, Troms county, Norway